The Alliance of German Organizations Abroad (or VdV) was a National Socialist umbrella organization founded in 1934 to unite all foreign Germans outside of the Reich.  Its headquarters was in Berlin.  The VdV was supposed to organize these Germans and to influence and win them over with Nazi propaganda, insofar as they were not yet part of the Foreign Organization of the NSDAP (NSDAP/AO).  Its journal was the Heimatbrief (Letter from Home).

Bibliography
Christian Zentner, Friedemann Bedürftig (1991). The Encyclopedia of the Third Reich.  Macmillan, New York.

See also 
Volksbund für das Deutschtum im Ausland
Bund Deutscher Osten

Organizations established in 1934
1934 establishments in Germany
Nazi propaganda organizations